Speed Madness may refer to:

 Speed Madness (1925 film), American silent action film
 Speed Madness (1932 film), American action film